Alaska Bible College is a private Christian bible college in Palmer, Alaska. It is nationally accredited by the Association for Biblical Higher Education.

The school was established in 1966 by missionary Vincent James Joy, a graduate of Moody Bible Institute who became a pioneer missionary to the Ahtna people and also founded Central Alaskan Missions (which is now a branch of SEND International).  Joy began ABC with a focus on theological education for those preparing for ministry within Alaska.

A primary distinctive of the school is its emphasis on training individuals, including Alaska Natives, for rural ministry in the Far North.

References

External links
 
 KCAM Radio

1966 establishments in Alaska
Association for Biblical Higher Education
Bible colleges
Education in Anchorage, Alaska
Education in Matanuska-Susitna Borough, Alaska
Education in Unorganized Borough, Alaska
Educational institutions established in 1966
Seminaries and theological colleges in Alaska